Jon Michael Hubbard (born December 12, 1946) is a Republican former member of the Arkansas House of Representatives for District 75 in Jonesboro in Craighead County in eastern Arkansas.

Early life
Hubbard was raised in North Little Rock and graduated from North Little Rock High School in 1964. He attended Arkansas State Teachers College (now University of Central Arkansas) in Conway, Arkansas and served in the United States Air Force for two years. He received his bachelor degree from Ouachita Baptist University in 1968.

Career
Hubbard defeated incumbent Joan Cash, a Democrat, in the 2010 elections.

In 2009, Hubbard published a book titled Letters to the Editor: Confessions of a Frustrated Conservative, in which he said "the institution of slavery that the black race has long believed to be an abomination upon its people may actually have been a blessing in disguise," that black people don't "appreciate the value of a good education", and that in the future immigration, both legal and illegal, must lead to "planned wars or extermination" which would be "as necessary as eating and breathing".

In 2012, Hubbard won the Republican primary in District 58, rather than District 75. However, he was defeated in the general election by Democrat Harold Copenhaver.

Personal life
Hubbard was a coach at Forest Heights Junior High School in Little Rock, Arkansas for two years and Greenbrier High School in Tennessee for two years. Afterwards, he started in the insurance business in 1974 at American Fidelity Insurance Company and then Prudential Insurance Company. From 1991 to 1995, he was a teacher and coach at Walnut Ridge High School in Walnut Ridge, Arkansas. He then worked as owner/agent of Arkansas First Stop Insurance, Inc., from 1995 to 2006. Since 2006, he has been a marketing representative for Equity Insurance Company. He worked as an insurance agent until 1991.

Hubbard survived a heart attack in 2011.

References

External links
Jon Hubbard

1946 births
Living people
American sports coaches
Republican Party members of the Arkansas House of Representatives
People from Camden, Arkansas
Politicians from Jonesboro, Arkansas
Politicians from North Little Rock, Arkansas
University of Central Arkansas alumni
Ouachita Baptist University alumni
American non-fiction writers
Schoolteachers from Arkansas
Businesspeople from Arkansas
Insurance agents
United States Air Force airmen